Holmium acetylacetonate is a coordination complex, with the chemical formula of Ho(C5H7O2)3 or Ho(acac)3. It can be obtained via the reaction between metallic holmium or holmium(III) hydride with acetylacetone, or via the reaction between Holmium(III) chloride and ammonium acetylacetonate. Its anhydrous form is stable in a dry atmosphere but forms a hydrate in humid air.

Like related lanthanide acetylacetonates, the complex is usually isolated with additional ligands.  The dihydrate, which has been characterized by X-ray crystallography, features 8-coordinate Ho(III). No crystallographic evidence has been reported for anhydrous derivatives.

References

External reading

 
 

Holmium compounds
Acetylacetonate complexes